A shillelagh is combination cudgel and walking stick that is generally associated with Ireland and Irish folklore.

Shillelagh may also refer to:

Places in Ireland 
Shillelagh, County Wicklow, a village
Shillelagh (barony), an administrative unit of County Wicklow

Other uses 
MGM-51 Shillelagh, an American anti-tank missile
Jeweled Shillelagh, American collegiate sports trophy of the Notre Dame–Purdue football rivalry